I Married a Dead Man is a 1948 novel by American crime writer Cornell Woolrich under the pseudonym William Irish.

Plot 
Eight months pregnant and alone, Helen Georgesson's only hope is the five dollar bill and the train ticket back to her home town in San Francisco. On the train she befriends newlyweds Patrice and Hugh Hazzard. Tragedy strikes and the train crashes, killing both the Hazzards instantly. When Helen awakes in hospital she discovers she has given birth in the wreckage, and that she has been mistaken for Patrice. On finding out Hugh's family are wealthy and never met the real Patrice, Helen decides to go along with the misunderstanding for the sake of her son.

The Hazzards don't suspect a thing and Helen and her son settle into their new life without a hitch. Until one day, a letter arrives in the mail, containing a single sentence; "Who are you?"

Adaptations 
The novel was adapted in 1950 into a movie directed by Mitchell Leisen called No Man of Her Own, and has been the basis for many films over the decades including Kati Patang (1971), the French film J'ai épousé une ombre (1983), and Mrs. Winterbourne (1996).

References

1948 American novels
American novels adapted into films
Novels by Cornell Woolrich
Works published under a pseudonym
American crime novels